Razor is an integrated suite software configuration management system from Visible Systems, which provides process management, issue/problem tracking, version control, and release management.

Razor provides a framework for managing software development processes, including support for agile and waterfall methodologies. It includes a built-in issue tracking system that allows users to log and track bugs, defects, and other issues that arise during the software development process. It also includes a version control system that allows users to track changes to their code over time and collaborate with other team members. Apart from all these functions, the Razor have a release management system that allows users to manage the release process for their software, including tracking the status of different releases and managing the distribution of software to customers and other stakeholders.

Razor runs on Windows, NT, Unix, Linux, or Motif environments.  It was developed as an integrated product to support Integrated Development Environment for IBM VisualAge, Microsoft Visual Studio, Microsoft.NET, Rational Rose, and PowerBuilder.

References 

Bug and issue tracking software
Version control systems